Pieter Frederik Jansen van Vuren (born 2 April 1991) is a South African rugby union player for  in the Currie Cup. His regular position is lock.

References

South African rugby union players
Living people
1991 births
Rugby union players from Pretoria
Rugby union locks
Griquas (rugby union) players
Griffons (rugby union) players
Pumas (Currie Cup) players
Lions (United Rugby Championship) players
Golden Lions players